Jerome Blake (born August 18, 1995) is a Canadian track and field athlete specializing in the sprint events. As a member of the Canadian 4×100 m relay team, he is the 2020 Olympic silver medalist and the 2022 World champion.

Career

Early career
Blake was born in Buff Bay, Jamaica, where he started his young track career as a hurdler in the 400 m. After attending his brother's soccer game, he began testing his speed on track which a coach noticed and convinced him to switch to sprinting. The Blake family moved to Canada in 2013, taking up residence in Kelowna, British Columbia initially, and eventually moving to Burnaby. Because he did not acquire Canadian citizenship until 2018, he was unable to participate in many international junior competitions, though he remarked that had he been born in Canada "I probably would have been playing hockey." Blake competed for British Columbia at the 2017 Canada Summer Games where he won gold in both the 100 m and 200 m.

Debuting at the senior level, Blake soon became a regular member of Canada's relay teams, winning a gold medal at the 2018 NACAC Championships. Blake competed at the 2019 Pan American Games in Lima, finishing sixth in the 200 m and fourth in the 4×100 relay.

2020 Summer Olympics
In the buildup to the 2020 Summer Olympics, which was taking place in 2021 due to the COVID-19 pandemic, Blake competed at the Canadian National Trials. There he placed in second place, and as a result, Blake was named to Canada's Olympic team. He then set a new personal best just before the games, running 10.15 seconds in Stockholm in early July. As a part of the 4x100 m relay team, he won a bronze medal in the 4x100 m relay. On 18 February 2022, Great Britain was stripped of its silver medal in the men's 4×100 m relay after the Court of Arbitration for Sport confirmed CJ Ujah’s doping violation. Canada was upgraded to silver.

Individual success and World gold
Following the Olympic season, Blake enjoyed a breakout year in terms of individual results, beginning with an upset victory in the 100 m at the USATF Bermuda Games that saw him finish ahead of American stars Noah Lyles and Erriyon Knighton. On the 2022 Diamond League circuit, he won a bronze medal at the British Grand Prix in Birmingham. The Canadian relay team won gold in the 4×100 m at the same event. In the 200 m, Blake won the Golden Spike Ostrava on May 31, narrowly beating Elijah Hall at the line.

At the 2022 World Athletics Championships in Eugene, Oregon, Blake did not make it out of the heats of the 100 m, but qualified to the semi-finals of the 200 m. Finishing third in his semi-final, he did not advance further, noting that it "wasn't what I wanted, but it is what it is. It's my first world championships, and I made it to the semifinals." In advance of the 4×100 m relay, the prospects of the Canadian team were called into question due to anchor runner Andre De Grasse's struggles with COVID-19 infection shortly before the championships. However, the Canadian team qualified for the finals with the third-fastest time in the heats, only 0.01 seconds out of second. In the final, the Canadians staged a major upset victory over the heavily favoured American team to take the gold medal, aided by smooth baton exchanges while the Americans made multiple fumbles, breaking the national record in the process. This was Canada's third gold in the event, and the others being consecutive Donovan Bailey-era wins in 1995 and 1997. The result "stunned" the heavily American crowd at Hayward Field, though De Grasse noted, "there's a lot of Canadian flags out there, a lot of fans cheering us on." Blake ran an 8.86 time on the second leg of the race, critical to the result.

Blake was initially named to the Canadian team for the 2022 Commonwealth Games but withdrew after the World Championships, with Athletics Canada citing a need "to properly recover and prepare for the rest of the season."

References

External links
World Athletics profile

1995 births
Living people
Canadian male track and field athletes
Athletes (track and field) at the 2019 Pan American Games
Canadian people of Jamaican descent
Sportspeople from Burnaby
Pan American Games competitors for Canada
Jamaican emigrants to Canada
Black Canadian track and field athletes
People from Portland Parish
Athletes (track and field) at the 2020 Summer Olympics
Medalists at the 2020 Summer Olympics
Olympic track and field athletes of Canada
Olympic silver medalists in athletics (track and field)
Olympic silver medalists for Canada
20th-century Canadian people
21st-century Canadian people